is a Japanese idol, enka singer, and actress.

Biography

In 1973, she was part of "a hit female trio", which also included musicians Momoe Yamaguchi and Junko Sakurada. The music trio became popular as part of the television program Producing the Stars (Star Tanjō!); they were known as "The Trio of Third-Year Junior High School Students" ("Hana no Chu 3 Trio").

She debuted in 1972, at age 13, with the song  (Professor), receiving numerous music awards for it. The song reached the #3 position on the Oricon charts. Other hits include  (Classmates), "Chugaku Sannensei" (Junior High School Third Grade), "Okaasan" (Mother) and "Ettou Tsubame" (The Wintering Swallow). She won the Best Singer prize for "Ettou Tsubame" at the 25th Japan Record Awards. She retired when she married Shinichi Mori in 1986, but in 2006 returned to the stage with the single "Bara Iro no Mirai". The song reached the #14 position on the Oricon charts.

In addition to being a singer, she has acted in a number of Japanese movies and TV dramas. ONE OK ROCK vocalist Takahiro Moriuchi and MY FIRST STORY vocalist Hiroki Moriuchi are her and Shinichi Mori's sons.

Masako Mori has performed a total of 15 times at Kōhaku Uta Gassen.

In March of 2019, Masako Mori announced that she was retiring from showbusiness again.

Discography

Biggest hits

References

External links 
 
 Official profile at King Records

1958 births
Living people
People from Utsunomiya, Tochigi
Enka singers
Japanese idols
Japanese actresses
Japanese television personalities
Japanese essayists
Japanese radio personalities
King Records (Japan) artists
Pony Canyon artists
Singing talent show winners
Tokuma Japan Communications artists